The 1971–72 Serie A season was won by Juventus.

Teams
Mantova, Atalanta and Catanzaro had been promoted from Serie B.

Final classification

Results

Top goalscorers

References and sources
Almanacco Illustrato del Calcio - La Storia 1898-2004, Panini Edizioni, Modena, September 2005

External links
  - All results on RSSSF Website.

1971-72
Italy
1